Victoria "Vicky" Williamson (born 15 September 1993) is an elite British bobsledder and former track cyclist  who specialised in the sprint disciplines. In 2013, with Rebecca James, she won the bronze medal in the team sprint at the World Track Cycling Championships.

Early life
Williamson was educated at Norwich High School for Girls. At the suggestion of one of her coaches at the City of Norwich Athletic Club, she switched from athletics to cycling in 2008.  She entered the Girls4Gold programme, a group that searches for talented athletes with a potential for cycling, before being accepted into the Olympic Development Programme (ODP). She then progressed onto the elite Podium Programme two years later, and made her senior debut at the 2013 World Championships in Minsk.

Career
At the 2011 Juniors Track World Championships in Moscow, she won a silver in the 500m time trial, a bronze in the sprint and came fifth in the keirin. She made her senior world debut very shortly after, and won a bronze medal with partner Becky James in the team sprint at the 2013 Track World Championships in Minsk, Belarus. Since then she continues to compete at an international level, picking up numerous medals. In 2017 she signed with Under Armour.

Crash and marriage
In January 2016 Williamson was involved in a traumatic crash with Dutch rider Elis Ligtlee, at the during an omnium sprint race at Six Days of Rotterdam (Zesdaagse Rotterdam). The collision with the fence resulted in Williamson suffering a broken neck and back, dislocating her pelvis and slipping a disc in her neck. Williamson's racing number burned her skin in the crash and according to her if it had become infected she would have had plastic surgery.

Williamson was left with a loss of feeling in her left leg, her starting leg, due to a trapped nerve but was hoping for full feeling by mid 2018. During this period she married Oliver Barnes. She hoped to complete her rehabilitation by the end of January and to race at the 2018 Commonwealth Games.

Return to track cycling
2018 saw the separation of her marriage. In late January 2019, three years after suffering career-threatening injuries, Williamson returned to competition. The now 25-year-old took part in the GB Cycling Team for sprint events for the 2018–19 UCI Track Cycling World Cup in Hong Kong. and qualified for the 2019 Track World Championships.

Switch to bobsleigh
In December 2019 Williamson announced that she was switching from cycling to bobsleigh, having participated in her first training camp with the British bobsleigh team.

Palmarès

2009
2nd Sprint, British National Track Championships – U16

2010

1st Sprint, British National Track Championships – Junior
2nd 500m TT, British National Track Championships – Junior

2011
2nd 500m TT, UCI Track World Championships – Junior
3rd Sprint, UCI Track World Championships – Junior
1st Sprint, British National Track Championships – Junior
1st 500m TT, British National Track Championships – Junior
3rd Sprint, British National Track Championships
3rd Keirin, British National Track Championships

2012
2nd Sprint, British National Track Championships
2nd Keirin, British National Track Championships
2nd 500m TT, British National Track Championships

2013
3rd Team sprint, UCI Track World Championships (with Becky James)
2nd 500m TT, British National Track Championships
3rd Team sprint, UEC European U23 Track Championships (with Becky James)

2014
Open des Nations sur Piste de Roubaix
1st Team Sprint (with Jessica Varnish)
3rd Sprint 
Track Cycling World Cup
3rd  Team sprint, Round 3, Guadalajara (with Dannielle Khan)
2nd Sprint, Revolution – Round 4, Manchester
2nd, British National Team Sprint Championships (with Katy Marchant)
2nd 500m time trial, British National Track Championships
3rd Individual sprint, British National Track Championships

2015
Revolution
1st Sprint – Round 4, Glasgow
2nd Keirin – Round 4, Glasgow
2nd British National Team Sprint Championships (with Shanaze Reade)
2nd 500m time trial, British National Track Championships
3rd Individual Sprint, British National Track Championships
UEC European U23 Track Championships
2nd  Team Sprint (with Katy Marchant) 
3rd  Sprint

References

External links

 
 
 Victoria Williamson at the British Bobsleigh and Skeleton Association
 

1993 births
Living people
Sportspeople from Norwich
People educated at Norwich High School for Girls
English female cyclists
English track cyclists
Cyclists at the 2014 Commonwealth Games
Commonwealth Games competitors for England
English female bobsledders